Nievera is a surname. Notable people with the surname include:

Bert Nievera (1936–2018), Filipino-American singer and businessman
Martin Nievera (born 1962), Filipino-American singer and TV host
Robin Nievera (born 1986), Filipino singer-songwriter and son of Martin Nievera and Pops Fernandez

Surnames of Philippine origin